ESBA may refer to:

European Small Business Alliance (ESBA), an advocacy group which represents small business entrepreneurs and the self-employed.
Eastern Sovereign Base Area